KHIL (1250 AM, "Classic Country") is a radio station licensed to serve Willcox, Arizona, United States. The station is owned by John Oberreuter and Mark Lucke, through licensee Willcox Radio, LLC. It airs a classic country music format using a transmitter with an output of 5,000 watts (day), and 196 watts (night). The station's programming is also simulcast on repeater station K251CG (98.1 FM) in Willcox.

The station was founded in 1958 by Rex Allen. It was assigned its KHIL call letters by the Federal Communications Commission.

In 2007, KHIL applied to relocate to Kearny, Arizona, with a change in frequency to 1260 kHz and a power upgrade 10,000 watts. This application was dismissed by the FCC on April 21, 2008, and KHIL remains in Willcox with a daytime power of 5,000 watts. At that time, Lucke had become the only paid employee (down from a staff of 10 in 2003).

KHIL was featured in a December 2018 in a documentary published by The Atlantic, Lonesome Willcox. A June 2019 report in The Guardian portrayed the station as being at the risk of closure, with Lucke keeping operations up without pay.

Ownership
In April 2002, Lakeshore Media LLC completed its purchase of KHIL and KWCX-FM from Cathy Ann Enterprises LLC. The sale price was reported to be $1.1 million.

In March 2003, Clear Channel Communications reached a deal to acquire KHIL and KWCX-FM from Lakeshore Media LLC for $2.5 million, but that deal was contingent on the relocation of KWCX-FM to the Tucson area. The FCC denied the move and the deal fell through.

In July 2007, KZLZ LLC reached an agreement to acquire KHIL and KWCX-FM from Lakeshore Media LLC for a reported sale price of $900,000.

Effective November 22, 2017, KZLZ LLC sold KHIL to Willcox Radio, LLC for $150,000.

Translator

References

External links
 

 
 
 

HIL
Mass media in Cochise County, Arizona
Classic country radio stations in the United States
Radio stations established in 1961
1961 establishments in Arizona